The event was being held for the first time during the open-era.

Manuel Santana won the title, beating Jan Leschly 8–6, 6–3 in the final.

Seeds

 Charlie Pasarell (semifinals)
 Manuel Santana (champion)
 Arthur Ashe (semifinals)
 Jan Leschly (final)

Draw

Singles draw

External links
 Main draw

U.S. Pro Indoor
Tennis tournaments in the United States
1968 in American tennis